The altar rail (also known as a communion rail or chancel rail) is a low barrier, sometimes ornate and usually made of stone, wood or metal in some combination, delimiting the chancel or the sanctuary and altar in a church, from the nave and other parts that contain the congregation. Often, a central gate or gap divides the line into two parts. Rails are a very common, but not inevitable, feature of Roman Catholic, Anglican, Lutheran, and Methodist churches. They are usually about two feet 6 inches high, with a padded step at the bottom, and designed so that the wider top of the rail can support the forearms or elbows of a kneeling person.

The altar rail is a modest substitute for earlier barriers demarcating the chancel, the area containing the altar, which was reserved, with greatly varying degrees of strictness, for officiating clergy, including boys as choristers and altar servers. Although it only emerged after the Protestant Reformation, it has been found convenient by both Roman Catholic and more traditional Protestant churches, such as the Anglican, Lutheran and Methodist churches, although it is disliked by many Reformed and nondenominational churches.

History

Barriers of various kinds often mark off as especially sacred the area of a church close to the altar, which is largely reserved for ordained clergy. The Temple in Jerusalem contained a barrier of this kind, which separated the Courtyard of the Israelites from the Courtyard of the Priests. The templon was typical for the Late Antique period.  In the Armenian Apostolic Church, curtains are still drawn to cut off that area during the holiest moments of the liturgy. In Eastern Orthodox and related rites, this evolved into a solid, icon-clad screen, called the iconostasis, that has three doorways which usually have doors and curtains that can be closed or drawn aside at various times.

Following the exposition of the doctrine of transubstantiation at the fourth Lateran Council of 1215, clergy were required to ensure that the blessed sacrament was to be kept protected from irreverent access or abuse. The area of the church used by the lay congregation was screened off from that used by the clergy.  Apart from the congregation, pet dogs were often taken to church, and a dog-proof barrier was needed. More recent rails often fail to do this. 

Barriers demarcating the chancel, such as the rood screen, became increasing elaborate. Theywere largely swept away after both the Protestant Reformation and then the Counter-Reformation prioritized the congregation having a good view of what was happening in the chancel. Now the low communion rail is generally the only barrier. Despite being essentially a Counter-Reformation invention, this has proved useful and accepted in the Protestant churches that dispense communion. The screen enjoyed a small revival in the 19th century, after the passionate urgings of Augustus Pugin, who wrote A Treatise on Chancel Screens and Rood Lofts, and others.

There were medieval structures like communion rails, but the various types of screen were much more common.  A church in Hasle, Bornholm claims to have "a rare 15th-century altar rail"; perhaps, like other examples, this is in fact a sawn-off medieval screen. The origin of the modern form has been described by one historian as "nebulous", but it probably emerged from Italy in the 16th century. The German Lutherans and the Church of England were not far behind in adopting it, perhaps without being aware of the Italian versions.  In England the rail became one of the focuses of tussles between the High Church and Low Church factions, and in many churches they were added, removed and re-added at different times.

Archbishop Laud was a strong supporter of rails, but the common story that he introduced them to England is incorrect; he was trying to prevent Puritan clergy from continuing to remove them, and his pressure in favour of rails was bound up with his very controversial "altar policy", reasserting the placement of the altar in its medieval position.  Matthew Wren, Laudian Bishop of Ely, was imprisoned during the whole of the English Commonwealth. Wren defended himself against charges of enforcing altar rails, which he pointed out had been found in many English churches "time out of mind".  

In both Catholic churches and Anglican ones following Laudian instructions, the congregation was now asked to come up to the rails and receive communion kneeling at them, replacing a variety of earlier habits.  This too was controversial in England, and the Laudian party did not push too hard for this in many dioceses.

In many of the parishes of the Lutheran Churches and the Methodist Churches, the use of altar rails have remained more common. There is typically no specific regulation concerning their presence or use, although they remain a common feature even in newly constructed churches. Their continued popularity results from a preference on the part of many to assume a posture of kneeling to receive the Eucharist.  For those sanctuaries without an altar rail, in some cases a portable rail with attached kneeler is used for those who wish to kneel to receive the Eucharist.

Catholic Church

Newly constructed Catholic churches rarely have altar rails, which were once common in parish churches, those of the late nineteenth century being particularly decorative. Communicants knelt at the railings to receive the Eucharist by a priest; today they typically stand. After the Second Vatican Council, many parishes removed their altar rails, and an unfounded idea arose that the council or the Holy See had ordered the change. Previously, only altar servers were allowed to join the clergy within the sanctuary during the celebration of the liturgy. Now, lay readers of Scripture and extraordinary ministers of Holy Communion enter the sanctuary during Mass.

Some Catholics and many architects and planners criticised some removals, often on liturgical, historical and æsthetic grounds. While in some states, the Roman Catholic Church has adopted a minimalist approach towards the removal of altar rails; in other countries, for example in Ireland, almost every re-ordering eliminated altar rails. Many Catholics resisted the changes: some took legal action to try to prevent the removal of altar rails and of other traditional features in pre-Vatican II sanctuaries.

Not all liberal Catholics supported the changes to sanctuaries. Some disputed the belief that the altar rails were a barrier, claiming that many churches were able to allow full participation by the laity in the revised Order of the Mass without removing altar rails. In recent times, a number of restorations of historic churches have re-introduced altar rails, since the idea that Vatican II required their removal is a misconception.

The General Instruction of the Roman Missal states explicitly that the sanctuary "should be appropriately marked off from the body of the church either by its being somewhat elevated or by a particular structure and ornamentation".

While a diocesan bishop is competent to decide concrete questions concerning the setting up or removal of altar rails in a church in the diocese committed to his pastoral care, he is required prudently to make that decision in accordance with the norms of law, taking into account the wishes of the faithful.  Any decision taken by the bishop, however, may be appealed by hierarchical recourse to the competent instance of the Holy See which, in this case, is the Congregation for Divine Worship and the Discipline of the Sacraments.

Lutheran churches

Within Lutheranism, the altar rail is the common place for a pastor to hear a confession, confession being generally required to receive the Eucharist for the first time.

Methodist churches
In many Methodist churches, communicants receive holy communion at the chancel rails, devoutly kneeling. The rite of confirmation, as well as the imposition of ashes on Ash Wednesday takes place at the chancel rail in many Methodist parishes. The chancel rail also serves as the place where many individuals go, during the part of the Methodist liturgy called the Altar Call or An Invitation to Christian Discipleship, to experience the New Birth. 

Some people who have already had the New Birth go to the chancel rails to receive entire sanctification. Others go there repent of their sins, as well as pray. During this time, a Methodist minister attends to each person at the chancel rail, offering spiritual counsel.

See also 

Mourners' bench

Notes and references

Cox, J. Charles, English Church Fittings, Furniture and Accessories, 2008 reprint, Jeremy Mills Publishing, 9781905217939, google books
Spurr, John, The Post-Reformation: Religion, Politics and Society in Britain, 1603-1714, 2014 reprint, Routledge, 9781317882626, google books

External links
Altar Rail - Article from the Catholic Encyclopedia

Church architecture